Khamgaon (Legislative assembly constituency) is one of the 288 constituencies of Maharashtra Vidhan Sabha and one of the seven which are located in the Buldhana district.

It is a part of the Buldhana (Lok Sabha constituency) along with five other Vidhan Sabha(assembly) constituencies, viz. Buldhana, Chikhali, Sindkhed Raja, Mehkar and Jalgaon(Jamod).

The seventh Malkapur Assembly constituency from the Buldhana district is a part of the Raver (Lok Sabha constituency) from neighbouring Jalgaon district.

As of 2008, the extent of the constituency comprised the entire Khamgaon taluka and part of the Shegaon taluka with the Jalamb, Pahurjira and Matargaon revenue circles. The remaining part of the Shegaon taluka along with Shegaon Municipal Council are in extent of Jalgaon (Jamod) Assembly constituency.

Members of Legislative Assembly

ELection Result

Assembly Elections 2019

See also
Khamgaon
Jalamb
Matargaon
Shegaon
Pahurjira

Notes

Assembly constituencies of Maharashtra